Krumen may refer to:
the Krumen people
the Krumen language